Neopaschia lemairei is a species of snout moth in the genus Neopaschia. It was described by Viette in 1973, and is known from Madagascar.

References

Moths described in 1973
Epipaschiinae
Moths of Madagascar
Moths of Africa